Triamcinolone furetonide (developmental code name HE-192; also known as triamcinolone acetonide 21-(2-benzofurancarboxylate)) is a synthetic glucocorticoid corticosteroid which was never marketed.

References

Acetonides
Secondary alcohols
Corticosteroid esters
Fluoroarenes
Glucocorticoids
Pregnanes
Triketones
Abandoned drugs